Edward Skottowe Northrop (June 12, 1911 – August 12, 2003) was a United States district judge of the United States District Court for the District of Maryland.

Education and career

Born in Chevy Chase, Maryland, Northrop received a Bachelor of Laws from George Washington University Law School in 1937. He was manager of the Village of Chevy Chase from 1935 to 1941. He was attorney for the Village of Chevy Chase from 1941 to 1961. He was in the United States Navy as a Commander from 1941 to 1945. He was in private practice in Rockville, Maryland and Washington, D.C. from 1945 to 1961. He was a member of the Maryland Senate from 1954 to 1961, serving as Majority Leader from 1958 to 1961.

Federal judicial service

Northrop was nominated by President John F. Kennedy on August 23, 1961, to the United States District Court for the District of Maryland, to a new seat created by 75 Stat. 80. He was confirmed by the United States Senate on September 1, 1961, and received his commission on September 5, 1961. He served as Chief Judge from 1970 to 1981. He was a member of the Judicial Panel on Multidistrict Litigation from 1979 to 1983. He assumed senior status on June 12, 1981. He served as a Judge of the United States Foreign Intelligence Surveillance Court of Review from January 11, 1985 to January 10, 1982. Northrop served in senior status until his death on August 12, 2003, in Sandy Spring, Maryland.

References

Sources
 

1911 births
2003 deaths
20th-century American judges
George Washington University Law School alumni
Judges of the United States District Court for the District of Maryland
People from Chevy Chase, Maryland
People from Sandy Spring, Maryland
United States district court judges appointed by John F. Kennedy
United States Navy officers
Judges of the United States Foreign Intelligence Surveillance Court of Review